Mounira Solh (19 September 1911 – 27 November 2010) was a pioneer advocate for the rights of women and people with disabilities in Lebanon. She was one of the first women in Lebanon and the Middle East to run for parliament. She ran for a seat in the Parliament of Lebanon in 1960, 1964 and 1968. She was also a humanitarian with decades of volunteer and charity work.

Mounira Solh founded Al Amal Institute for the Disabled in 1959, the first center of its kind in Lebanon and the Arab world. She also founded in 1984 the Association of the Parents of Mentally Disabled Children in Lebanon, the first of its kind in Lebanon.

Life and work
Mounira Solh was one of the most prominent female leaders of the demonstrations that led to Lebanon's independence in 1943. 
An advocate of women's rights, she was the first Muslim woman to run for parliamentary elections in Lebanon and probably the Arab world when she ran for a Beirut seat in 1960. She was a candidate to the legislative elections in Lebanon twice after that, in 1964 and 1968. She never won an election.

One of the earliest women to attend university in Lebanon and the Arab world, Mounira Solh graduated in 1933 from the American Junior College for Women (the Lebanese American University today). Soon after, she travelled to Baghdad, Iraq, where she worked as a teacher for two years, contributing to the national school curriculum revamp. On her return to Lebanon in 1935, she married her first cousin, Wahid Solh despite her father's disapproval. She eloped with her new husband to Palestine for a few months before returning home after receiving word that her father had accepted her marriage.

Along with other pioneering women, Mounira Solh worked relentlessly for the advancement of laws pertaining to women and people with disabilities. In 1951, she became a member of the Lebanese Council of Women. She was also active in humanitarian and charity work, and led the national team of relief volunteers to help victims of the Beirut Great Fire in 1956.

A year after her husband's assassination during the 1958 civil war, Mounira Solh established the Al Amal Institute for the Disabled. She was inspired by her desire to help her son Salim and other children with disability.
In 1968, she became a member of Rehabilitation International, the world's leading organization for disability rights. That same year, she was elected vice-president of the Lebanese Council of Women and in 1970 she became a life member of the International Council of Women.
She earned a special distinction from U.S. President Richard Nixon after attending three annual conferences between 1970 and 1972 of the U.S. President's Committee on Employment of People with Disabilities, Washington D.C.
In her struggle to advance the rights of women and people with disability, Mounira Solh has officially represented Lebanon at various international conferences around the world including in Lisbon, Tokyo, Sydney and Mexico.

Mounira Solh celebrated in 2009 the 50th anniversary of Al Amal Institute for the Disabled in a Golden Jubilee Ceremony during which a special film on her lifetime achievements and pioneering humanitarian work was screened.

Mounira Solh died on 27 November 2010. She was 99 years old.
Her daughter Sana and son Nassib continue to run Al Amal Institute for the Disabled in Broumana, Lebanon.

Family
Mounira Solh hails from a prominent family which gave Lebanon four prime ministers, Riad Solh, Sami Solh, Takieddine Solh and Rachid Solh. The Solh family is originally from the ancient port city of Sidon in southern Lebanon. Her father, Abdel Rahim Solh, is a Sunni Muslim, and her mother, Mahiba Ashkar, a Maronite Catholic Christian from Broumana, a resort town in the Metn mountains east of Beirut.
Mounira Solh had five children: Samir (had severe disabilities, deceased at a young age), Najla (died from illness at a young age), Salim (had mental disabilities, 1942–2002), Sana and Nassib. She had nine grandchildren: Assaad, Nadim and Nayla Razzouk, Nael and Hala Raad, and Wahid, Mounira, Omar and Maria Solh.

Education
Mounira Solh completed her schooling at the American School in the city of Tripoli, northern Lebanon, in 1929. She later went on to attend the American Junior College for Women (the Lebanese American University today) from where she graduated in 1933.

In 1950, she received a Nursing Certificate from the Lebanese Red Cross.

In 1975, she was awarded a Diploma for a Study Workshop on Disablement and Rehabilitation from the Selly Oak Colleges in Birmingham, U.K.

Awards and distinctions
Mounira Solh is the recipient of numerous awards, including the National Order of the Cedar, granted by the President of the Republic in 2000.
She is the recipient of the prestigious Rose Fitzgerald Kennedy Mothers' Leadership Award 2000-2005 which celebrates a mother of a child with intellectual disability "who has demonstrated outstanding leadership and long standing commitment to the development and improvement of services, advocacy, or public policy on behalf of her son or daughter or others with mental retardation."

She also received the following awards:
Mothers of Lebanon distinction from Haigazian University, Beirut, Lebanon, in May 2004
Arab Woman Award by the Hariri Foundation in 2002
Gold Award by the President of the Lebanese Republic in 1995
Public Health medal by the President of the Lebanese Republic in 1974
Special Distinction from Rehabilitation International in Sydney, Australia, 1972
Special Distinction at the U.S. President's Committee on Employment of People with Disabilities, Washington D.C in 1972

References

External links
Washington Report, Washington D.C., U.S.A., 2002.
Syndicate of Hospitals in Lebanon. 
Lebanese Council of Women, Beirut, Lebanon, 30 November 2009.
Lebanese Army, Yarzeh, Lebanon, May 2004. 
Saida City, Sidon, Lebanon, 31 March 2010. 
Saida City, Sidon, Lebanon, 30 November 2010. 
Lebanese Women's Awakening. 
Wikimapia.

Lebanese disability rights activists
Lebanese women's rights activists
Lebanese women activists
Recipients of the National Order of the Cedar
1911 births
2010 deaths
Lebanese American University alumni
Lebanese Muslims
Lebanese politicians
Lebanese women in politics
20th-century women politicians
Al Solh family